Durham is a civil parish in Restigouche County, New Brunswick, Canada.

For governance purposes it is divided between the town of Heron Bay, village of Belledune, the Moose Meadows 4 Indian reserve, and the Restigouche rural district; the town, village, and rural district are members of the Restigouche Regional Service Commission. 

Prior to the 2023 governance reform, the parish was divided between Belledune, the Indian reserve, and the local service districts of Chaleur and Lorne. The 2023 reform had no effect on Belledune but the community of Benjamin River on the western parish line was annexed by Heron Bay; Lorne and the remainder of Chaleur became part of the Restigouche rural district.

Origin of name
The parish was named in honour of the Earl of Durham, Governor General of British North America at the time the legislation erecting the parish was passed; he resigned his post before the Act became effective.

History
Durham was erected in 1840 from Beresford Parish. Durham comprised Restigouche County between the eastern county line and a line due south from the mouth of Benjamin River.

In 1881 the county line was altered, removing part of Durham and adding it to Gloucester County.

Boundaries
Durham Parish is bounded:

 on the north by Chaleur Bay;
 on the east and southeast by the Gloucester County line;
 on the south by Gloucester County and the Northumberland County line;
 on the west by a line running true south from the mouth of Benjamin River;
 including any islands in front except Heron Island.

Communities
Communities at least partly within the parish. bold indicates an incorporated municipality; italics indicate a name no longer in official use

 Black Point
 Doyleville
 Gravel Hill
 Hickey Settlement
 Keepover
 Lapointe Settlement
 Lorne
 Nash Creek
 Sea Side (Dickie)
 Winton Crossing
 Belledune
 Archibald Settlement
 Armstrong Brook
 Becketville
 Belledune River
 Durham Centre
 Halfway
 Jacquet River
 Mitchell Settlement
 Sunnyside

Bodies of water
Bodies of water at least partly within the parish.

 Belledune River
 Benjamin River
 Jacquet River
 Louison River
 Nigadoo River
 Tetagouche River
 Harrys Bogan
 Nash Creek
 Chaleur Bay
 Antinouri Lake
 Hayes Lake
 Lower Jack Burns Lake
 Lower Tetagouche Lake
 Millstream Lake
 Pothole Lake
 Rocky Turn Pool
 Upper Jack Burns Lake

Other notable places
Parks, historic sites, and other noteworthy places at least partly within the parish.
 Jacquet River Gorge Protected Natural Area
 Rocky Turn Falls

Demographics
Parish population total does not include portion in Belledune

Population

Language

Access Routes
Highways and numbered routes that run through the parish, including external routes that start or finish at the parish limits:

Highways

Principal Routes

Secondary Routes:
None

External Routes:
None

See also
List of parishes in New Brunswick

Notes

References

Parishes of Restigouche County, New Brunswick